The canton of Haut-Eyrieux (before 2016: canton of Le Cheylard) is an administrative division of the Ardèche department, southern France. Its borders were modified at the French canton reorganisation which came into effect in March 2015. Its seat is in Le Cheylard.

It consists of the following communes:
 
Accons
Albon-d'Ardèche
Arcens
Beauvène
Belsentes
Borée
Chalencon
Le Chambon
Chanéac
Le Cheylard
Devesset
Dornas
Dunière-sur-Eyrieux
Gluiras
Issamoulenc
Jaunac
Lachapelle-sous-Chanéac
Marcols-les-Eaux
Mariac
Mars
Les Ollières-sur-Eyrieux
Rochepaule
La Rochette
Saint-Agrève
Saint-Andéol-de-Fourchades
Saint-André-en-Vivarais
Saint-Barthélemy-le-Meil
Saint-Christol
Saint-Cierge-sous-le-Cheylard
Saint-Clément
Saint-Étienne-de-Serre
Saint-Genest-Lachamp
Saint-Jean-Roure
Saint-Jeure-d'Andaure
Saint-Julien-d'Intres
Saint-Julien-du-Gua
Saint-Martial
Saint-Martin-de-Valamas
Saint-Maurice-en-Chalencon
Saint-Michel-d'Aurance
Saint-Michel-de-Chabrillanoux
Saint-Pierreville
Saint-Sauveur-de-Montagut
Saint-Vincent-de-Durfort

References

Cantons of Ardèche